The lac à Mars is a fresh body of water in the watershed of the rivière à Mars North-West, the rivière à Mars and the Saguenay River. This body of water is located in the unorganized territory of Lac-Pikauba, in the Charlevoix Regional County Municipality, in the administrative region of Saguenay–Lac-Saint-Jean, in the province of Quebec, in Canada. Lac à Mars is located in the central eastern part of the Laurentides Wildlife Reserve.

Upstream of the port, industrial and urban area, the rivière à Mars valley is mainly served by the Consol Paper road. The rivière à Mars North-West is served by a few other secondary forest roads for forestry and recreational tourism activities.

Forestry is the main economic activity in the sector; recreational tourism, second.

The surface of the lac à March is usually frozen from the beginning of December to the end of March, however the safe circulation on the ice is generally made from mid-December to mid-March.

Geography 
The main watersheds near Lake Mars are:
 north side: Cyriac River, rivière à Mars North-West, rivière à Mars, rivière à Pierre, ruisseau au Goéland;
 east side: rivière à Mars, Raymond lake, Vents lake, Chemin des Canots River;
 south side: Lac des Pas Perdus, Bouleaux lake, Pas Perdus lake, Grand lac des Enfers, Philippe stream, Chicoutimi River;
 west side: Pikauba Lake, Davis lake, Fortier lake, Claveau brook, Noir brook, Apica River.

This lake has a narrow bay stretching  to the east. The mouth of this lake is located at the bottom of a bay on the north shore, at:
  east of a mountain peak reaching ;
  north of Lac des Bouleaux;
  west of the course of the rivière à Mars;
  east of a bay on Pikauba Lake;
  south of the confluence of the rivière à Mars North-West and the rivière à Mars;
  south-east of downtown Saguenay (city).

From the confluence of the lac à Mars, the current descends the course of:
 the rivière à Mars North-West on  generally towards the north;
 the rivière à Mars on  generally towards the north;
 the Baie des Ha! Ha! on  towards the northeast;
 the Saguenay River on  eastwards to Tadoussac where it merges with the Saint Lawrence estuary.

Toponymy 
The place names “Rivière à Mars”, “Rivière à Mars Nord-Ouest” and “Lac à Mars” have the same origin.

The toponym "lac à Mars" was formalized on December 5, 1968, by the Commission de toponymie du Québec.

References 

Lakes of Capitale-Nationale
Charlevoix Regional County Municipality
Laurentides Wildlife Reserve